Nicholas Lachester Fairley (born January 23, 1988) is a former American football defensive tackle. He played college football for Auburn University, where he was recognized as an All-American and was a member of a BCS National Championship team. Fairley was drafted by the Detroit Lions in the first round of the 2011 NFL Draft. He has also played for the St. Louis Rams and the New Orleans Saints.

Early years
Fairley was born in Mobile, Alabama.  He attended Williamson High School in Mobile, where he was a two-way lineman and also lettered in basketball. Regarded as a three-star prospect, he was projected as an offensive guard. He committed to Auburn, but was not able to qualify academically.

College career

Copiah-Lincoln Community College
Fairley attended Copiah-Lincoln Community College from 2007 to 2008. After being redshirted in 2007, he played in seven games in 2008. He recorded 63 tackles and seven sacks in the 2008 season.

Auburn University
Fairley transferred to Auburn University, where he played for the Auburn Tigers football team in 2009 and 2010. He finished the 2009 season with two starts in 13 games and recorded 28 tackles. Surprisingly quick for his size, his tendency to be flamboyant following a successful play placed him as a person of concern for officials.  In 2010, he became the 2nd player from Auburn to win the Lombardi Award. He was coached by Lombardi winner and former Auburn player Tracy Rocker, and became the first player to win the Lombardi and be coached by a winner of the award.

During the 2011 BCS National Championship Game against the Oregon Ducks, Fairley had five tackles, a sack, and a forced fumble. Three of his tackles were made behind the line of scrimmage.  Fairley was selected as the defensive player of the game.

Professional career
Only four days after the 2011 BCS National Championship Game, Fairley decided to forgo his final year of eligibility, entering the 2011 NFL Draft. He was initially projected to be the first pick in the draft. His measurements at the combine showed him to be 6 feet 3 7/8 inches tall and 291 pounds, somewhat less than his listing of 6-5 and 300 pounds at Auburn. After the NFL Combine, he was projected in the 8-12 range.

Detroit Lions
Fairley was drafted by the Detroit Lions in the first round as the 13th pick overall. He signed a 4-year contract with the Lions on July 28, 2011. The contract was for four years and worth $10 million with a $5.7 million signing bonus.

In Detroit, he joined All-Pro Ndamukong Suh on the interior of the Detroit defensive line. Though at times his play was stout, he was troubled by inconsistency.

In his second season in the NFL Fairley recorded 5.5 sacks, 2 forced fumbles, and 26 tackles. However, on December 12, 2012, Fairley was put on the injured reserve list, ending his season.

Fairley's fourth season had been productive for the most part. However, on October 26, 2014, Fairley sustained a Medial collateral ligament sprain against the Atlanta Falcons at Wembley Stadium in London.

St. Louis Rams
On March 13, 2015, Fairley signed a one-year, $5 million contract with the St. Louis Rams. Fairley played in 15 games for the Rams in 2015 along their defensive line rotation and recorded 29 tackles (18 solo), a split sack, a pass defended, and one fumble recovery. On December 31, 2015, Fairley was placed on injured reserve.

New Orleans Saints 
On March 28, 2016, Fairley signed a one-year, $5 million contract with the New Orleans Saints. After recording career-highs in tackles and sacks in 2016, Fairley signed a four-year, $30 million contract extension with the Saints during the 2017 off-season.

On June 26, 2017, the Saints placed Fairley on the reserve/non-football-illness list regarding a lingering heart condition, ending his 2017 season.

On February 5, 2018, Fairley was released by the Saints.

NFL career statistics

Personal life 
Since entering the NFL, Fairley has had a number of run-ins with the law. On April 3, 2012, Fairley was arrested in Mobile, Alabama for marijuana possession. The charges were dismissed in December 2012.

On May 27, 2012, Fairley was arrested by Alabama State Troopers for driving under the influence and attempting to elude police. He was also ticketed for reckless driving, having an open container of alcohol in the vehicle and no proof of insurance.

On June 3, 2017, it was revealed that Fairley was diagnosed with a heart condition that could threaten his career.

On December 1, 2018, Fairley was arrested on criminal menacing charges when he allegedly threatened a person with a gun.

References

External links
New Orleans Saints bio
St. Louis Rams bio
Detroit Lions bio
Auburn Tigers bio

1988 births
Living people
All-American college football players
American football defensive tackles
Auburn Tigers football players
Copiah-Lincoln Wolfpack football players
Detroit Lions players
St. Louis Rams players
New Orleans Saints players
Players of American football from Alabama
Sportspeople from Mobile, Alabama